Kalyanam Conditions Apply is a 2017 Indian Tamil-language romantic comedy web series starring Senthil Kumar, Sreeja Chandran and produced by A. Mirchi Play Original and A. TRM Sri Barati Associate. It premiered online through Naver TV Cast and YouTube every Thursday starting from 30 November 2017 and 5 January 2018 on Radio Mirchi Tamil YouTube Channel. Season 2 premiered on 22 July 2019.Mirchi Originals launches the third season of ‘Kalyanam: Conditions Apply’ web series on 19 March 2021.

Main Cast
 Senthil Kumar as Senthil
 Sreeja Chandran as Sreeja

Episodes

Season 1

Season 2

Episode 1: First Honeymoon, Second Chance (22 July 2019)
Episode 2: Win - Win Situation (22 July 2019)
Episode 3: Road Rage, Any Age (22 July 2019)
Episode 4: Online Shopping, When Stopping? (22 July 2019)
Episode 5: Big Boss from Bombay (22 July 2019)
Episode 6: Smart Phone, Peace Gone(22 July 2019)

Season 3
Episode 1: Maid For Each Other( 15 March 2021)
Episode 2: Online Class Full Mass (17 March 2021)
Episode 3: Chennai Super Uncles(19 March 2021)
Episode 4: Yaaradi Nee Mohini (21 March 2021)
Episode 5: Guest of Horror (25 March 2021)
Episode 6: Sreeja Vin Ulaga Nayagan (27 March 2021)

References

External links
Kalyanam Conditions Apply YouTube

Tamil-language web series
Tamil-language romance television series
2010s Tamil-language television series
2017 web series debuts
2017 Tamil-language television series debuts
2018 Tamil-language television series endings